The Third Dudley Senanayake cabinet was the central government of Ceylon led by Prime Minister Dudley Senanayake between 1965 and 1970. It was formed in March 1965 after the parliamentary election and it ended in May 1970 after the opposition's victory in the parliamentary election.

Cabinet members

Parliamentary secretaries

References

1965 establishments in Ceylon
1970 disestablishments in Ceylon
Cabinets disestablished in 1970
Cabinets established in 1965
Cabinet of Sri Lanka
Ministries of Elizabeth II